White point is a term in image science.

White Point may also refer to:

 White Point, Newfoundland and Labrador
 White Point, Queens, Nova Scotia
 White Point, Victoria, Nova Scotia
 White Point (Jackson County, Oregon)
 White Point Garden
 White Point Nature Preserve
 Mythimna albipuncta, a moth with the common name of "white-point".